Sternopriscus is a genus of beetles in the family Dytiscidae, containing the following species:

 Sternopriscus alligatorensis Hendrich & Watts, 2004
 Sternopriscus alpinus Hendrich & Watts, 2004
 Sternopriscus aquilonaris Hendrich & Watts, 2004
 Sternopriscus balkei Hendrich & Watts, 2004
 Sternopriscus barbarae Hendrich & Watts, 2004
 Sternopriscus browni Sharp, 1882
 Sternopriscus clavatus Sharp, 1882
 Sternopriscus eikei Hendrich & Watts, 2007
 Sternopriscus emmae Hendrich & Watts, 2007
 Sternopriscus goldbergi Hendrich & Watts, 2004
 Sternopriscus hansardii (Clark, 1862)
 Sternopriscus marginatus Watts, 1978
 Sternopriscus meadfootii (Clark, 1862)
 Sternopriscus minimus Lea, 1899
 Sternopriscus montanus Watts, 1978
 Sternopriscus mouchampsi Hendrich & Watts, 2004
 Sternopriscus multimaculatus (Clark, 1862)
 Sternopriscus mundanus Watts, 1978
 Sternopriscus pilbaraensis Hendrich & Watts, 2004
 Sternopriscus signatus Sharp, 1882
 Sternopriscus storeyi Hendrich & Watts, 2004
 Sternopriscus tarsalis Sharp, 1882
 Sternopriscus tasmanicus Sharp, 1882
 Sternopriscus wallumphilia Hendrich & Watts, 2004
 Sternopriscus wattsi Pederzani, 1999
 Sternopriscus weckwerthi Hendrich & Watts, 2004
 Sternopriscus wehnckei Sharp, 1882
 Sternopriscus weiri Hendrich & Watts, 2004
 Sternopriscus williamsi Hendrich & Watts, 2007

References

Dytiscidae